Sivuch is the Russian word for sea lion, and may refer to:

 Sivuch, a Russian Bora-class hovercraft later renamed Bora
 Russian gunboat Sivuch, two ships of the Imperial Russian Navy

See also
 Sivuch'i Rocks, a group of islets and rocks